The Shanghai Cobra is a 1945 mystery film directed by Phil Karlson and starring Sidney Toler as Charlie Chan.

Synopsis
When three bank employees are killed with cobra venom, Detective Chan recalls an oddly similar case ten years earlier in Shanghai. Benson Fong and Mantan Moreland, return as Tommy "Number Three Son" Chan, and Birmingham Brown.

Cast
Sidney Toler as Charlie Chan
Mantan Moreland as Birmingham Brown
Benson Fong as Tommy Chan
James Cardwell as Ned Stewart
Joan Barclay as Paula Webb (alias of Paula van Horn, daughter of Jan van Horn) 
Addison Richards as John Adams (alias Jan van Horn), Sixth National Bank guard
Arthur Loft as Bradford Harris (alias Special Agent Hume)
Janet Warren as Record Machine Operator
Gene Stutenroth as Morgan, a gangster
Cyril Delevanti as Detective Larkin, a police undercover officer at the Sixth National Bank
George Chandler Joe Nelson, coffee shop proprietor
James Flavin H.R. Jarvis, chemical engineer
 John Goldsworthy as Inspector Mainwaring

References

External links
Charlie Chan Family

Shanghai Cobra at Letterbox DVD
Shanghai Cobra at BFI

1945 films
1945 crime films
American black-and-white films
Charlie Chan films
Monogram Pictures films
Films directed by Phil Karlson
1945 mystery films
American mystery films
1940s American films